Doncaster was launched in 1792 at South Shields. She spent many years as a transport. It was during this period that she became, during an experimental trial, the first British ship to be propelled by a propeller. Later, she traded across the North Atlantic with Quebec and north. She was wrecked in ice in 1835 off Cape North, Cape Breton Island.

Career
Doncaster first appeared in Lloyd's Register (LR), in 1794.

In February 1800, the English inventor and engineer Edward Shorter proposed using a propeller attached to a rod angled down temporarily deployed from the deck above the waterline of a vessel and thus requiring no water seal. The device was intended only to assist becalmed sailing vessels. She thus became the first British vessel to be moved by a propeller.

Lloyd's Register ceased carrying Doncaster in 1810, but she still appeared in the Register of Shipping (RS). 

Lloyd's List showed Doncaster, Smith, master, sailing from Quebec on 24 September 1808. Ship arrival and departure data suggest that he had been master of Doncaster since at least 1807, and that she had sailed to the West Indies and Quebec. Doncaster reappeared in Lloyd's Register in 1813. The information did not always agree with that in the Register of Shipping.

On 25 November 1824, Doncaster, of Newcastle, Marshall, master, was in the harbour at Portsmouth. She was discharging timber from Quebec when she was forced on shore, where she grounded.

Fate
Doncaster, Foster, master, was lost on 24 May 1835 in ice off Cape North, Cape Breton Island. Ice crushed her and she sank off St. Paul Island, Nova Scotia She was on a voyage from Newcastle upon Tyne to Miramichi. The brig Dorothys rescued Doncasters six crew members.

Citations

Reference
 

1792 ships
Ships built on the River Tyne
Age of Sail merchant ships of England
Migrant ships to Canada
Maritime incidents in May 1835